
Gmina Radzanów is a rural gmina (administrative district) in Białobrzegi County, Masovian Voivodeship, in east-central Poland.

Villages
Gmina Radzanów contains the villages and settlements of Błeszno, Branica, Bukówno, Czarnocin, Grabina, Grotki, Kadłubska Wola, Kępina, Kozłów, Ludwików, Łukaszów, Młodynie Dolne, Młodynie Górne, Ocieść, Podgórze, Podlesie, Ratoszyn, Radzanów, Rogolin, Śliwiny, Smardzew, Wólka Kadłubska, Zacharzów and Żydy.

Neighbouring gminas
Gmina Radzanów is bordered by the gminas of Białobrzegi, Potworów, Przytyk, Stara Błotnica and Wyśmierzyce.

References
Polish official population figures 2006

Radzanow
Białobrzegi County